Carl Robert Corazzini (born April 21, 1979) is an American former professional ice hockey player who played in the National Hockey League, American Hockey League, ECHL, and in Sweden and Germany between 2001 and 2011. He played 19 games in the NHL with the Boston Bruins and Chicago Blackhawks.

Playing career
As a youth, he played in the 1993 Quebec International Pee-Wee Hockey Tournament with the Boston Braves minor ice hockey team.

In high school, Corazzini played for Saint Sebastian's School in Needham, Massachusetts where he was team captain as a senior.  In college, he played for Boston University and was the team captain in his final year.

On August 8, 2001, he was signed by the Boston Bruins as a free agent. He scored his first NHL goal with the Bruins in a game against the New York Rangers. On July 16, 2006, Corazzini signed a one-year contract with the Chicago Blackhawks. Before the 2007–08 season, he signed a one-year contract with the Detroit Red Wings.

After recording career highs in assists and points with the Grand Rapids Griffins during the 2007–08 season, Corazzini signed a one-year, two-way contract with the Edmonton Oilers on July 15, 2008.

Coaching career
Corazzini is currently the head coach at St. Mark's School in the ISL league, Eberhart division.  In his first year as head coach (2014/15), St. Mark's won the Eberhart and NEPSAC Piatelli/Simmons (Small School) Championships.  The team followed up with a second NEPSAC Championship in Corazzini's second year as coach. Corazzini has coached countless players who went on to star in college and international competition. The first of his former players to be drafted was selected by the Anaheim Ducks in the 2019 NHL Entry Draft.

Career statistics

Regular season and playoffs

Awards and honors

References

External links 

1979 births
Living people
American men's ice hockey right wingers
Atlantic City Boardwalk Bullies players
Boston Bruins players
Boston University Terriers men's ice hockey players
Chicago Blackhawks players
ERC Ingolstadt players
Grand Rapids Griffins players
Hershey Bears players
Ice hockey players from Massachusetts
Lahti Pelicans players
Norfolk Admirals players
Sportspeople from Framingham, Massachusetts
Peoria Rivermen (AHL) players
Providence Bruins players
Springfield Falcons players
Straubing Tigers players
Undrafted National Hockey League players
VIK Västerås HK players
AHCA Division I men's ice hockey All-Americans